A S Patil is a member of the Bharatiya Janata Party.

Life before politics
Aminappagouda Sanganagouda Patil was born in Nadahalli Village of Muddebihal Taluk of Vijayapura District into a humble family. He was the third among the six children of his parents, Sri Sanganagouda Patil and Smt. Gangubai. Inspired by the teachings of Sri Basavanna, he took it upon himself to work towards the elimination of social evils and contribute in his own way towards social change. This prompted him to pursue social service.

A S Patil completed his primary education in his native village. He later moved to Sri Siddaganga Mutt in Tumkur to complete his high school education under the tutelage of Dr. Shivakumara Swamiji. He inculcated spirituality, public service and other moral values. He is also trained in Sharana Sahitya and Vedopanishad.

He completed his graduation from Karnatak Science College in Dharwad and later went on to get a Postgraduate Degree in Geology from Karnataka University, Dharwad. During this time, he engaged himself actively in politics and emerged as a popular student leader.

After his student life, he began his professional career. Owing to his interest in mining, he left to Sanduru in 1995 and secured a job in VS Lad and Company. He rapidly climbed the job ladder and became the Senior Mining Engineer of the company in a span of six years. In 2006, he ventured into his own business in Sanduru and provided jobs to thousands of people. The difficulties faced by him to receive education during his younger days prompted him to allocate 25% of his total income towards the education of the underprivileged.

Personal life
A S Patil is married to Smt. Mahadevi A Patil Nadahalli. The couple have two sons:  Bharat Patil Nadahalli,who is a graduate in Business & Management from Cardiff University, UK and Sharath Patil Nadahalli, who is also a Business & Management Graduate from Birmingham University, UK.

Political journey
A S Patil is a visionary leader, and a great orator who has dedicated himself to social service and upliftment of Karnataka State. Given his great contribution towards social causes, the stage was set for his entry into politics. After much initiation from his admirers, Patil finally took the plunge and entered the world of politics. Below is a brief timeline of his illustrious political journey:

 2008-2013 : Won first election from Devara Hipparagi Constituency.
 2013-2018 : Won for the second time from Devara Hipparagi Constituency.
 2018–Present : Registered his third win from Muddebihal Constituency, associated with " Bharatiya Janata Party".

References 

Karnataka MLAs 2008–2013
Karnataka MLAs 2013–2018
Karnataka MLAs 2018–2023
Bharatiya Janata Party politicians from Karnataka
Living people
1969 births